Fabien Garcia (born 14 July 1994) is a French professional footballer who plays as a defender for San Antonio FC in the USL Championship.

References

Living people
1994 births
Association football defenders
French footballers
Ligue 2 players
US Colomiers Football players
En Avant Guingamp players
CS Sedan Ardennes players
Nîmes Olympique players
Austin Bold FC players
San Antonio FC players
USL Championship players
French expatriate footballers
French expatriate sportspeople in the United States
Sportspeople from Haute-Garonne
Footballers from Occitania (administrative region)